Trần Văn Tuý (born 20 July 1957 in Bắc Ninh Province) is the Secretary of the Party Committee in Bắc Ninh province. He is a member of the 11th Central Committee.

References

1957 births
Living people
People from Bắc Ninh province
Members of the National Assembly (Vietnam)